Zalog pod Uršulo is a settlement north of Dramlje in the Municipality of Šentjur, eastern Slovenia. The settlement, and the entire municipality, are included in the Savinja Statistical Region, which is in the Slovenian portion of the historical Duchy of Styria.

Name
The name of the settlement was changed from Zalog to Zalog pod Uršulo in 1953.

References

External links
Zalog pod Uršulo at Geopedia

Populated places in the Municipality of Šentjur